Eero Lohi (born 14 July 1927) is a Finnish modern pentathlete. He competed at the 1960 Summer Olympics.

References

External links
 

1927 births
Living people
Finnish male modern pentathletes
Olympic modern pentathletes of Finland
Modern pentathletes at the 1960 Summer Olympics
People from Ranua
Sportspeople from Lapland (Finland)